"American History X-cellent" is the seventeenth episode of the twenty-first season of the American animated television series The Simpsons, and the 458th episode overall. It originally aired on the Fox network in the United States on April 11, 2010. In this episode, Mr. Burns is arrested for possessing stolen art and Smithers is chosen to run the nuclear plant—only to turn into a misanthropic slave driver when his subordinates begin taking advantage of his kindness.

The episode was written by Michael Price and directed by Bob Anderson. The episode features references to Stephen King's The Green Mile and The Shawshank Redemption.

"American History X-cellent" has received positive reviews from critics and received a 2.7 Nielsen Rating in the 18-49 demographic.

Plot
Mr. Burns throws an elaborate Fourth of July party for himself, forcing his employees to wait on him and perform a Broadway-style musical number without pay. When Homer, Lenny and Carl become frustrated, they break into Burns' wine cellar and become completely drunk. Burns discovers this and calls the police, but the police soon notice that Burns' mansion contains stolen artwork including The Concert by Vermeer. He is arrested and paraded through the streets of Springfield inside a bamboo cage, where he is jeered by the townspeople on his way to prison. He leaves a reluctant Waylon Smithers in charge.

In prison, Burns is placed in a cell with another white-collar criminal, but then demands to be moved when he discovers his cellmate was educated at Dartmouth College and the University of Virginia. Burns soon finds himself in the company of a tough-looking felon (voiced by Kevin Michael Richardson), a born-again Christian who convinces Burns to find religion. The man became a born-again Christian when an inmate gave the man the book Helter Skelter with its subject Charles Manson on the cover; since the man was illiterate he misidentified the picture as Christ. He then "sucks" the evil, represented by green slime, out of Burns. The prison, first seen by Burns as a hell hole, now becomes a heaven hole: he joins the prison choir and a Beatles tribute band called "Stab Four" and reads the Holy Bible many times in the prison laundry while Sideshow Bob is being washed.

Meanwhile, Smithers assumes management at the nuclear plant and attempts to show the plant employees that he is nothing like Burns by being kind and accommodating. But when he joins Homer, Lenny and Carl for beer at Moe's, he overhears the three friends making fun of him. Smithers realizes why Burns scorns humanity and his behavior quickly deteriorates into that of a tyrant, to the point of releasing wolverines instead of Burns' hounds.

Homer, Lenny and Carl decide to break Burns out of prison by disguising themselves as prison guards to sneak into the institution and remove Burns from his cell. Burns, however, does not want to leave because he believes he has found his spiritual home. When the cellmate tries to stop them from escaping, Burns realizes that he misses being a power figure and that his toilet-tank baptism did not purge away all of his inner evil, stating that he forgot to suck some evil from between his toes, which had then multiplied rapidly and made him "a bigger bastard than ever". But Burns also wonders genuinely why his cellmate helped him; he is told that after killing so many rich white men over the years, he figured he would do right by at least one of them. The two men decide they are not so different and part company. Burns uses his money to leave the prison system, and is once again at the helm of the nuclear power plant, although he hopes his friend will gain another disciple. Burns' former cellmate finds a new disciple in Fat Tony.

Meanwhile, Bart and Lisa are forced to play with one another when Marge goes shopping (she notes that the mall is deserted when the townspeople are rioting, as is the case with Burns' trip to prison). When the two fight over Lisa's ant farm, it breaks and Santa's Little Helper eats all but one of the ants. The experience brings Lisa and Bart closer together, and they name the ant Annie (as in Little Orphan Annie, as well as the layman's term ant itself). They care for her as they would a child, but realize that she is near death. They decide to release her, so she can live out her last days in the wild, but as soon as they let her go Santa's Little Helper eats Annie.

Production

The episode was written by Michael Price and directed by Bob Anderson, his second credit of the season after "Rednecks and Broomsticks". The episode also features the second appearance of Kevin Michael Richardson who first appeared in "Homer the Whopper" and Joe Mantegna as Fat Tony. Sideshow Bob makes a non-speaking cameo appearance in this episode in where he is put in a dryer.

Cultural references
The Mr. Burns plot is based on Stephen King's novel The Green Mile, with the inmate being based on the character John Coffey.  The episode also parodies elements from The Shawshank Redemption, by the same author, including the prison and the warden. Another reference to Shawshank Redemption is that the felon tears a Rita Hayworth poster off the wall, uncovering a cross. The title is based on the film American History X. The picture in Mr. Burns' office is based on Saturn Devouring His Son by Francisco Goya.  Burns' induction to the prison is accompanied by "Prison Bound Blues" performed by John Lee Hooker.

Reception
In its original American broadcast, "American History X-cellent" was viewed by 5.649 million viewers and a 2.7 rating and 8 share in the 18-49 demographic tying with the previous week's episode. The episode ranked 20 in the 18-49 weekly Nielsen Rating.

The episode received positive reviews.

TVFanatic.com gave the episode a 3.5/5 saying "Overall, the main story line was great. Unfortunately, Bart and Lisa were given a weak side story, where really the only funny moments were Lisa telling Bart they need to keep the lines of communication open for organ transplants and Bart licking Lisa to try and earn her forgiveness."

Jason Hughes of TV Squad gave the episode a positive review saying "A pleasant enough episode of 'The Simpsons' made better by the presence of C. Montgomery Burns. Even Smithers upped his game, bringing the funny this week".

Emily VanDerWerff of The A.V. Club gave the episode a B, saying "I like Mr. Burns as a character enough, and I like the way the show tells stories about him enough to give this a mildly approving grade." VanDerWerff added that Lisa and Bart's story was "just plain stupid".

There were though a few mixed reviews.

Robert Canning of IGN gave the episode a 6.9/10 and saying it was "Passable" and "Though the potential was there, ‘American History X-cellent’ failed to deliver a would-be classic Mr. Burns episode. His time in prison was too mundane. Evil Mr. Burns is always more fun than a kindhearted Mr. Burns, and new and original ideas are always better than tired Shawshank references. Maybe we'll get an old school Mr. Burns episode next season." Readers, however, gave the episode 8.5/10.

References

External links

"American History X-cellent" at The Simpsons Archive

The Simpsons (season 21) episodes
2010 American television episodes